Ōkuwa Station (大桑駅) is the name of two train stations in Japan:

 Ōkuwa Station (Nagano)
 Ōkuwa Station (Tochigi)